Women in Haiti have equal constitutional rights as men in the economic, political, cultural and social fields, as well as in the family.

However, the reality in Haiti is quite far from the law: "political, economic and social features of Haiti negatively affect most Haitians, but Haitian women experience additional barriers to the full enjoyment of their basic rights due to predominant social beliefs that they are inferior to men and a historical pattern of discrimination and violence against them based on their sex. Discrimination against women is a structural feature in Haitian society and culture that has subsisted throughout its history, both in times of peace and unrest."

Women and society
Some Haitian scholars argue that Haitian peasant women are often less restricted socially than women in Western societies or even in comparison to more westernized elite Haitian women. They attribute this fact to the influence of African matriarchal systems and of the Haitian Vodou religion which places women at the center of society contrary to purely Judeo-Christian systems.  Women priests (named mambos) play equal roles to male priests or Houngan  in Haitian vodou.

The sexual equality inherent to Haitian vodou translates into the inclusion of women in all aspects of society. Peasant women specifically, because of their proximity to vodou, have traditionally played a crucial role in Haitian life. Compared to their Latin-American counterparts, the participation of Haitian women in agriculture, commerce and industry has been high. During the US occupation of Haiti (1915-1934) peasant women actively participated in guerilla warfare and anti-US intelligence gathering to free the country. Because of their involvement in commerce, Haitian peasant women have accumulated resources independent of their partners in contrast to more westernized elite Haitian women.

Political representation

The Haitian government contains a Ministry of Women's Affairs, but it also lacks the resources to address issues such as violence against women and harassment in the workplace. A number of political figures such as Michele Pierre-Louis, Haiti's second female Prime Minister, have adopted a determined agenda in order to fight inequalities and persecutions against women. Her position in office as Prime Minister has had positive effect on female political leadership in a country where the percentage of women in government at ministerial level was 25% in 2005.

History of the Haitian women's movement 

Women have been involved in social movements in Haiti since the battle for independence.

A women's movement emerged in Haiti in the 1930s during an economic crisis which is thought to have forced some middle-class Haitian women to work outside the home for the first time unlike peasant women who had always done so. This was also a time at which more elite women began to pursue post-secondary education and when L'Université D'Etat d'Haiti opened its doors to women. The first Haitian woman to receive a secondary education graduated during this period in 1933.

One of the first established feminist organizations in Haiti was called the Ligue Féminine d'Action Sociale (Feminine League for Social Action) and was created in 1934. Its mostly elite initial members included: Madeleine Sylvain, Alice Garoute, Fernande Bellegarde, Thérèse Hudicourt, Alice Mathon, Marie-Thérèse Colimon, Marie-Thérèse Poitevien. The Ligue was banned by the government two months after its founding. The league was reestablished when it agreed to study its goals instead of immediately implementing them. The league is credited for the granting of voting rights for women in 1957.

In 1950, writer and feminist Paulette Poujol-Oriol joined the league. She later served as President of the League from 1997 until her death on March 11, 2011. She was also a founding member of L'Alliance des Femmes Haitiennes, an umbrella organization for more than 50 women's groups.

Some women were appointed to government leadership positions under François Duvalier: Rosalie Adolphe (aka Madame Max Adolphe) was appointed head of the secret police Volontaires de La Sécurité Nationale, also known as the Tonton Macoute, while Lydia O. Jeanty was named Under-Secretary of Labor in 1957 and Lucienne Heurtelou, the widow of former President Dumarsais Estimé, was Haiti's first female ambassador. Marie-Denise Duvalier nearly succeeded her father in 1971.

Sexual violence 

Women in Haiti may suffer threats to their security and well-being because of rape, kidnapping and human trafficking. Women suffer the most from Haiti's chronic political instability.

Documented cases of politically motivated rape, massacres, forced disappearance, and violent assaults on entire neighborhoods increased greatly at the end of 1993 under the military dictatorship of Raoul Cédras. Reports from women's rights groups in Haiti revealed that women were targeted for abuse in ways and for reasons that men were not. Uniformed military personnel and their civilian allies threatened and attacked women's organizations for their work in defense of women's rights and subjected women to sex-specific abuse ranging from bludgeoning women's breasts to rape.

The troubles before the 2004 coup were seen by most of the nationwide women's group as a reminder of the 1991–94 coup d'etat tactics with the use of rape, kidnapping and murders as forms of intimidation. If most of the feminist activists in Haiti campaigned for the election of Jean-Bertrand Aristide before his first term (1991–1995), many of them, especially intellectuals like Myriam Merlet or Magalie Marcelin, condemned how the first democratically elected president of Haiti ruled the country during his second term (2000–2004). Other observers, more favorable of the Fanmi Lavalas party, were more inclined to criticise the period after the coup as a "rewind" back to the same dictatorship tactics, "a terror campaign employing rape, murder and disappearance as tactics, and rapidly increasing insecurity undermining all economic activity of the informal sector."

To this day, Haiti is "gripped by shocking levels of sexual violence against girls"; of particular concern is the number of cases of sexual violence reported in the run-up to or during Carnival.

Amnesty International and the Inter-American Commission on Human Rights have laid particular pressure on the duty of the state to act in due diligence necessary to prevent and eradicate violence and discrimination against women.

Though the MINUSTAH has come with a peace-keeping mandate, a number of cases have arisen where the UN soldiers were found to have abused women.

Education

Women's Education History

Women in Haiti do not benefit from an equal access to education, this has been an issue for a long time. When researching the history of women's education in Haiti, there are no accounts that start before 1844 since a male dominated society with colonial origins didn't allow girls and women to go to school. This formally changed with The Constitution in 1843, but the first actual account of a primary school establishment for girls was in Port-au-Prince the following year, 1844. The Although the political leadership tried to do something about the unequal education at that time, the economic and social barriers made it very difficult to reach that goal, and it wasn't as late as 1860, that there was a difference in the number of girls going to school. However, secondary school for women developed faster than the girls. The first secondary educational school was established by Marie-Rose Léodille Delaunay in 1850. Organized after the law of 1893, by 1895 the government had established six secondary institutions for women. Though most Latin American countries have achieved universal or near universal primary education for all children, for Haiti primary education, the enrollment rate of boys was still somewhat higher than that of girls by 1987.

The Overall System

The education system in Haiti is one that is underdeveloped. Although there are primary, secondary, and tertiary schools, attendance and graduation from these schools, and upper levels is low, being that the majority of the population are combating poverty and are focused on labour income in order to live. How the system is structured is that formal education begins at preschool followed by 9 years of fundamental education. Starting from the second year of secondary education, students are allowed to seek vocational training programs. Higher education after the completion of second year studies is not common but highly appraised being that most children don't have the chance to begin in the first place. Tuition rates have dramatically increased in the past starting from the preschool level. What once cost 1628 gourdes ($41) in 2004, increased to 4675 gourdes ($117) in 2007. This increase was 187% in the 3 years that most families simply cannot afford, especially for families in rural Haiti. The rural-urban difference is also considerable as nearly 25% of the women in urban areas have finished secondary school, compared with less than 2 percent in rural areas. Overall, according to a study by the Haitian Institute of Statistics and IT, 39% of Haitians has never attended school. There's a high percentage especially in the 6-12 age range that's at 37.7%. Situations only worsened after the 2010 earthquake.

Post 2010 Earthquake

More than 4,000 schools (preschool fundamental, secondary, higher education, and vocational institutions) were damaged and over 1,200 destroyed. The deaths of teachers and students were plenty more. The entire education system had to be shut down, not least because the Ministry of Education itself collapsed. “ With a lack of stable infrastructure. supplies, and a high demand for educated school officials, children, especially women, had to help their family in informal ways. A pre-earthquake study by the Inter-American Commission for Human Rights concluded that almost all Haitian girls work in the informal market, primarily between the ages of 5 and 9. Although sources would like to announce that educational inequality is narrowing as the average growth enrollment has been significantly greater for girls than for boys, it is simply not the case. As of 2015, only 60.7% of the population is literate. Males are more educated, about  64.3% of them know how to learn and write while women, constricted by gender roles and violence are only at 57.3%.

See also
Sexual violence in Haiti

General:
 Human rights in Haiti

References

Bibliography

 Haiti Rapes, Lyn Duff, Pacific News Service, Haiti Action Net, 10 March 2005
 Walking on Fire: Haitian Women's Stories of Survival and Resistance, Beverly Bell. Ithaca: Cornell UP, 2001
 Gender and Politics in Contemporary Haiti: The Duvalierist State, Transnationalism, and the Emergence of a New Feminism (1980–1990), Carolle Charles. Feminist Studies. 1995
 Challenging Violence: Haitian Women Unite Women's Rights and Human Rights, Anne Fuller, Association of Concerned African Scholars. Spring/Summer 1999

External links 

 
Women's rights in Haiti
Feminism in Haiti